Michal Masný (born 14 August 1979) is a Slovak professional volleyball coach and former player, a former member of the Slovakia national team. He currenlty serves as head coach for BKS Visła Bydgoszcz.

Career

Clubs
He was a runner-up in Austrian Volley League in 2003 with his team Hypo Tirol Innsbruck. In 2004 he won the Czech Volleyball League title. With Jastrzębski Węgiel he won a bronze medal in 2013–14 CEV Champions League by defeating Zenit Kazan and the PlusLiga bronze medal in the same year. He became a member of Polish club Aluron Virtu Warta Zawiercie in 2018.

National team
He is a member of Slovakia men's national volleyball team since 2003, participated in 2003 Men's European Volleyball Championship. In 2008 and 2011 he won two Men's European Volleyball League gold medals and achieved 3rd place in 2007. He was named the best setter in 2007 Men's European Volleyball League and 2011. In 2008 and 2009 he was named the best volleyball player in Slovakia.

Honours

Clubs
 National championships
 2002/2003  Austrian Championship, with Hypo Tirol Innsbruck
 2003/2004  Czech Championship, with Chance Odolena Voda
 2004/2005  Czech Championship, with Chance Odolena Voda

Individual awards
 2004: Czech Championship – Best Setter
 2004: Czech Championship – Best Setter
 2005: Czech Championship – Best Setter
 2007: European League – Best Setter
 2008: Best volleyball player in Slovakia
 2009: Best volleyball player in Slovakia
 2011: European League – Best Setter
 2014: Polish Cup – Best Setter

References

External links

 
 Player profile at PlusLiga.pl 
 Player profile at Volleybox.net

1979 births
Living people
Naturalized citizens of Poland
Sportspeople from Žilina
Slovak men's volleyball players
Slovak volleyball coaches
Slovak expatriate sportspeople in Poland
Expatriate volleyball players in Poland
Slovak expatriate sportspeople in the Czech Republic
Expatriate volleyball players in the Czech Republic
ZAKSA Kędzierzyn-Koźle players
BKS Visła Bydgoszcz players
Jastrzębski Węgiel players
Trefl Gdańsk players
Cuprum Lubin players
Warta Zawiercie players